Anekal Assembly constituency is one of the 224 constituencies in the Karnataka Legislative Assembly of Karnataka a south state of India. It is also part of Bangalore Rural Lok Sabha constituency. It is in Bangalore Urban district and is reserved for candidates belonging to the Scheduled Castes.

Members of Legislative Assembly

Mysore State (Hoskote Anekal constituency) 
 1951 (Seat-1): Lakshmidevi Ramanna, Indian National Congress
 1951 (Seat-2): H. T. Puttappa, Indian National Congress

Anekal

Election results

2018

See also
 Bangalore Urban district
 List of constituencies of Karnataka Legislative Assembly

References

Assembly constituencies of Karnataka
Bangalore Urban district